St. Catharines Falcons may refer to one of these junior hockey teams:

St. Catharines Falcons (1943–1947)
St. Catharines Falcons (1968–)